Pittsburg is a town in southern Polk County, Florida, United States at Latitude 27.65361 and Longitude: -81.50278, named for the industrial heritage of Pittsburgh, Pennsylvania. It was mostly known for phosphate mining and a heavy industry rail spur (since abandoned), used mainly for transporting phosphates and cattle. It is approximately five miles (8 km) north of Avon Park, Florida.

External links

Unincorporated communities in Polk County, Florida
Unincorporated communities in Florida